Mordellistena krauseri is a beetle in the genus Mordellistena of the family Mordellidae. It was described in 1986 by Plaza Infante.

References

krauseri
Beetles described in 1986